Murder by the Clock is a 1931 American pre-Code murder mystery film starring William "Stage" Boyd and Lilyan Tashman. The film is based on the novel of the same name by Rufus King and the play Dangerously Yours by Charles Beahan.

Plot
When a wealthy woman dies, she is buried with a loud horn in her crypt due to her fear of premature burial. Before her will can be read, her heirs start to die mysteriously.

Cast
William "Stage" Boyd as Lt. Valcour
Lilyan Tashman as Laura Endicott
Irving Pichel as Philip Endicott
Regis Toomey as Officer Cassidy
Sally O'Neil as Jane
Blanche Friderici as Julia Endicott
Walter McGrail as Herbert Endicott
Lester Vail as Thomas Hollander
Martha Mattox as Miss Roberts
Frank Sheridan as Chief of Police
Guy Oliver as Watchman

See also
The House That Shadows Built, a 1931 promotional film by Paramount

External links

1931 films
American mystery films
American black-and-white films
Films based on American novels
American films based on plays
Films directed by Edward Sloman
Paramount Pictures films
Films based on adaptations
1931 mystery films
1930s American films
1930s English-language films